Lufthansa Cargo Flight 8533 was a scheduled cargo flight from Tribhuvan International Airport in Nepal to Indira Gandhi International Airport in India operated by Lufthansa Cargo's Indian subsidiary Hinduja Cargo Services.

Aircraft and Crew 
The aircraft was a 17 year old Boeing 727-200 Freighter plane. It was delivered previously to Alitalia in 1981 as I-DIRS with Continental Airlines too operating the airframe as N586PE and N14416 before delivery to Hinduja Cargo Services as VT-LCI. There were 5 crew members on board, namely Gonjalez, Shahni, Vargava, Singh and Roy.

Flight 
The flight was carrying 21 tons of cargo, mostly loaded with textiles and carpets. The flight departed Runway 20 at Kathmandu's Tribhuvan International Airport. After take-off the flight made a 10-degree bank to the right for heading of 247 at 4.4DME. The Ground Proximity Warning System (GPWS) activated and sounded an alarm in the cockpit for 11 seconds. The speed was reduced to  causing the stick shaker to activate. VT-LCI impacted Champadevi Hills at 7:51 p.m. local time with no survivors.

See also 
 List of airplane accidents in Nepal
 Pakistan International Airlines Flight 268
 Thai Airways International Flight 311
 Necon Air Flight 128
 Asiana Airlines Flight 733
 Japan Air Lines Flight 123

Notes

References 

Aviation accidents and incidents in 1999
Accidents and incidents involving the Boeing 727
Aviation accidents and incidents in Nepal
1999 disasters in Nepal